Kumarakattuwa is a town that is situated in North Western, Sri Lanka.

Towns in Puttalam District